Deceit is a 2004 American television movie adapted from the 2000 British television serial of the same name. Marlo Thomas, the film's leading actress, also served as executive producer. This crime film follows Ellen McCarthy (Thomas) in her attempt to determine the circumstances of her rich husband's disappearance at sea. It was first broadcast on March 15, 2004 by Lifetime Television.

References

External links

2004 crime drama films
2004 crime thriller films
2004 television films
2004 films
American crime drama films
American crime thriller films

Crime television films
Films based on British novels
Films based on crime novels
Films shot in New Zealand
Films based on television series
Television films based on television series

American drama television films

2000s English-language films

2000s American films